Stuart House may refer to:

United Kingdom
 Stuart House (Cornwall), Liskeard, Cornwall

United States

Henry Stuart House, Montrose, Alabama, listed on the National Register of Historic Places (NRHP) in Baldwin County
Dr. Richard and Paulina Stuart House, Des Moines, Iowa, NRHP-listed in Polk County
John Stuart House (Glendale, Kentucky), NRHP-listed in Hardin County, Kentucky
Jesse Stuart House, Greenup, Kentucky, NRHP-listed in Greenup County, Kentucky
Charles E. Stuart House, Kalamazoo, Michigan, NRHP-listed in Kalamazoo County, Michigan
Robert Stuart House, Mackinac Island, Michigan, NRHP-listed in Mackinac County
Dr. Stuart House, Dayton, Oregon, NRHP-listed in Yamhill County
Gilbert Stuart Birthplace, Saunderstown, Rhode Island, NRHP-listed in Washington County
Col. John Stuart House, Charleston, South Carolina, NRHP-listed in Charleston
Stuart House (Victoria, Texas), NRHP-listed in Victoria County, Texas
J.E.B. Stuart Birthplace, at Laurel Hill Farm, Ararat, Virginia, NRHP-listed in Patrick County
Stuart House (Staunton, Virginia), NRHP-listed in Staunton
Stuart House and Gardens, Seattle, Washington, NRHP-listed in King County
Stuart Manor, Lewisburg, West Virginia, NRHP-listed in Greenbrier County
W. Scott Stuart House, West Union, West Virginia, NRHP-listed in Doddridge County

See also
Stewart House (disambiguation)
John Stuart House (disambiguation)
Stuart Building (disambiguation)